Eucalyptus sicilifolia is a species of small ironbark tree that is endemic to Queensland. It has dark ironbark on the trunk and branches, narrow lance-shaped to curved adult leaves, flower buds in groups of seven, white flowers and cup-shaped to barrel-shaped fruit.

Description

It has rough, dark grey to black ironbark on the trunk and branches. Flowering occurs from July to October and the flowers are white.

Taxonomy and naming
Eucalyptus sicilifolia was first formally described in 1991 by Lawrie Johnson and Ken Hill in the journal Telopea, from specimens collected on Little St Peter Hill, near Springsure. The specific epithet (sicilifolia) is from the Latin sicilis meaning a "sickle" and folium meaning a "leaf", referring to the curved leaves.

Distribution and habitat
This eucalypt has a restricted distribution near the type location where it grows in low woodland in rocky places.

Conservation status
This eucalyptus is classified as "vulnerable" under the Queensland Government Nature Conservation Act 1992.

See also
List of Eucalyptus species

References

Trees of Australia
sicilifolia
Myrtales of Australia
Flora of Queensland
Plants described in 1991